The 1998 Big 12 Conference baseball tournament was the second played in Big 12 history, and the first to be held at AT&T Bricktown Ballpark in Oklahoma City, OK from May 14 through 17.  Texas Tech won the tournament and earned the Big 12 Conference's automatic bid to the 1998 NCAA Division I baseball tournament. The format followed that used by the NCAA Division I Baseball Championship at the time: a six-team, double-elimination tournament.

Regular season standings
Source:

Colorado did not sponsor a baseball team.

Tournament

Iowa State, Kansas, Kansas State, Nebraska, and Texas did not make the tournament.

All-Tournament team

See also
College World Series
NCAA Division I Baseball Championship
Big 12 Conference baseball tournament

References

Big 12 Tourney media guide 
Boydsworld 1998 Standings

Tournament
Big 12 Conference Baseball Tournament
Big 12 Conference baseball tournament
Big 12 Conference baseball tournament
Baseball competitions in Oklahoma City
College sports tournaments in Oklahoma